Christopher Ofili,  (born 10 October 1968) is a British painter who is best known for his paintings incorporating elephant dung. He was Turner Prize-winner and one of the Young British Artists. Since 2005, Ofili has been living and working in Trinidad and Tobago, where he currently resides in the city of Port of Spain. He also has lived and worked in London and Brooklyn. 

Ofili has utilized resin, beads, oil paint, glitter, lumps of elephant dung and cut-outs from pornographic magazines as painting elements. His work has been classified as "punk art."

Early life and education
Ofili was born in Manchester, England, to parents May and Michael Ofili of Nigerian descent. When he was eleven, his father left the family and moved back to Nigeria. Ofili was for some years educated at St. Pius X High School for Boys, and then at Xaverian College in Victoria Park, Manchester. Ofili completed a foundation course in art at Tameside College in Ashton-under-Lyne in Greater Manchester and then studied in London, at the Chelsea School of Art from 1988 to 1991 and at the Royal College of Art from 1991 to 1993. In the autumn of 1992, he got a one-year exchange scholarship to Universität der Künste Berlin.

Ofili visited Trinidad for the first time in 2000, when he was invited by an international art trust to attend a painting workshop in Port of Spain. He permanently moved to Trinidad in 2005. In 2002, he married Roba El-Essawy, former singer with trip-hop band Attica Blues. They divorced in 2019. He maintains a studio in Port of Spain, Trinidad.

Career
Ofili's early work was heavily influenced by Jean-Michel Basquiat, Georg Baselitz, Philip Guston, and George Condo. Peter Doig was doing graduate work at the Chelsea College of Arts when Ofili was an undergraduate, and they soon became friends. In 2014, art critic Roberta Smith held that Ofili has much in common with painters like Mickalene Thomas, Kerry James Marshall, Robert Colescott and Ellen Gallagher, and with more distant precedents such as Bob Thompson, Beauford Delaney and William H. Johnson.

Ofili was established through exhibitions by Charles Saatchi at his gallery in north London and the travelling exhibition Sensation (1997), becoming recognised as one of the few British artists of African / Caribbean descent to break through as a member of the Young British Artists group. Ofili has also had numerous solo shows since the early 1990s, including at Southampton City Art Gallery]. In 1998, Ofili won the Turner Prize, and in 2003 he was selected to represent Britain at the Venice Biennale of that year, where his work for the British Pavilion was done in collaboration with the architect David Adjaye.

In 1992 he won a scholarship that allowed him to travel to Zimbabwe. Ofili studied cave paintings there, which had some effect on his style.

Between 1995 and 2005, Ofili focused on a series of watercolors, each about 9½ by 6½ inches and produced in a single sitting. They predominantly feature heads of men and women, as well as some studies of flowers and birds. Ofili's paintings also make reference to blaxploitation films and gangsta rap, seeking to question racial and sexual stereotypes in a humorous way. In a series of faces that Ofili called Harems, each arrangement consists of one man with as many as four women on each side of him.

Ofili's work is often built up in layers of paint, resin, glitter, dung (mainly elephant) and other materials to create a collage. Though Ofili's detractors often state that he "splatters" elephant dung on his pictures, this is inaccurate: he sometimes applies it directly to the canvas in the form of dried spherical lumps, and sometimes, in the same form, uses it as varnished foot-like supports on which the paintings stand.

Ofili has been founder and prime mover behind the short-lived Freeness Project. This project involved the coming together of artists, producers and musicians of minority ethnic groups (Asian and African) in an attempt to expose the music that may be unheard in other spaces. Freeness allowed the creativity of unsigned contemporary British ethnic minority artists to be heard. The result of months of tours to 10 cities in the UK resulted in Freeness Volume 1 – a compilation of works that were shown during the tour.

After relocating to Trinidad in 2005, Ofili began a series of blue paintings inspired by the Jab Jab or "blue devils" who participate in the Trinidad and Tobago Carnival, and the Expressionist group of German and Russian artists, Der Blaue Reiter. These paintings often employed the use of a silver, acrylic background with layers of dark oil pigment on top. Later iterations of these works were shown at Ofili's solo show Chris Ofili: Day and Night at The New Museum of New York which were installed in a very dimly lit room, causing viewers to adjust their eyes to the darkness in order to see the paintings.

Ofili was appointed Commander of the Order of the British Empire (CBE) in the 2017 New Year Honours for services to art. Ofili was included in the 2019 edition of the Powerlist, ranking the 100 most influential Black Britons.

Exhibitions
Ofili's work was featured in a museum in the 1995 exhibition Brilliant! New Art from London at the Walker Art Center. Significant solo exhibitions include the Arts Club of Chicago (2010), Kestnergesellschaft, Hanover (2006), the Studio Museum in Harlem, New York (2005), and Southampton City Art Gallery (1998). In 2010, Tate Britain presented the most extensive exhibition of his work to date. In 2014, The New Museum in New York presented the first, major solo show of Ofili's work in the U.S. titled Chris Ofili: Night and Day.

Controversy

The Holy Virgin Mary
One of his paintings, The Holy Virgin Mary, a depiction of the Virgin Mary, was at issue in a lawsuit between the mayor of New York City, Rudy Giuliani, and the Brooklyn Museum of Art when it was exhibited there in 1999 as a part of the "Sensation" exhibit. The painting depicted a Black Madonna surrounded by images from blaxploitation movies and close-ups of female genitalia cut from pornographic magazines, and elephant dung. These were formed into shapes reminiscent of the cherubim and seraphim commonly depicted in images of the Immaculate Conception and the Assumption of Mary. Following the scandal surrounding this painting, Bernard Goldberg ranked Ofili No. 86 in 100 People Who Are Screwing Up America. Red Grooms showed his support of the artist by purchasing one of Ofili's paintings in 1999, even after Giuliani famously exclaimed, "There’s nothing in the First Amendment that supports horrible and disgusting projects!" The painting was owned by David Walsh and was on display at the Museum of Old and New Art in Hobart, Tasmania. Steven A. Cohen then owned it for three years and donated the painting to the Museum of Modern Art.

The Upper Room and the Tate Gallery

The Upper Room is an installation of 13 paintings of rhesus macaque monkeys by Ofili in a specially designed room. It was bought by the Tate Gallery in 2005 and caused controversy as Ofili was on the board of the Tate Trustees at the time of the purchase. In 2006 the Charity Commission censured the Tate for this purchase.

Art market
His Orgena, a glittery portrait of a black woman created by the artist for his Turner Prize-winning exhibit at the Tate in 1998 was sold to an American collector for a record GBP 1.8 million, over its GBP 1 million high estimate, at Christie's London in 2010. In 2015, art collector David Walsh sold Ofili's 8-foot-tall The Holy Virgin Mary for 2.9 million pounds at Christie's.

References

External links
Caroline Deeds and Kate Vogel "Artist Chris Ofili: beyond the tears", The Guardian, 3 February 2010. Tate Media film about Chris Ofili's 2010 exhibition at Tate Modern and how his move to Trinidad has freed up his work.

Chris Ofili page, David Zwirner.
Victoria Miro Gallery: Chris Ofili
"Turner Prize 1998 artists: Chris Ofili", Tate.
"Chris Ofili profile", BBC, 1 December 1998
Defence of the Tate The Upper Room purchase.
Criticism of the Tate The Upper Room purchase. Stuckism.
Mark Hudson, "Chris Ofili: 'I wander deep into the forest - where it's scary'", The Telegraph, 25 January 2010.
Chris Ofili, Rizzoli International, Fall 2009. Contributors include David Adjaye, Thelma Golden, Okwui Enwezor, Peter Doig and Kara Walker. 
"Shock and awe: The art of Chris Ofili"; feature by Michael Glover, and extract from "Ekow Eshun interviews Chris Ofili", edited by Helen Little in Chris Ofili (Tate Publishing, 2010), The Independent, 22 January 2010.
Chris Ofili. Edited by Massimiliano Gioni, Gary Carrion-Murayari and Margot Norton. Skira Rizzoli, 2014. 

1968 births
Living people
Artists from Manchester
English people of Nigerian descent
20th-century British painters
British male painters
21st-century British painters
Alumni of Chelsea College of Arts
Alumni of the Royal College of Art
Black British artists
Trinidad and Tobago painters
British contemporary artists
Turner Prize winners
Young British Artists
Commanders of the Order of the British Empire
21st-century male artists
Nigerian painters